Peter Blakeley is an Australian adult contemporary singer and songwriter. Blakeley has released three solo albums and eleven singles.

Blakeley was a lead singer for Rockmelons in the mid-1980s and launched his solo career in 1987 and had a hit single in Australia in 1990 with "Crying in the Chapel" (not the 1950s song).

Albums

Studio albums

Soundtracks

Extended plays

Singles

References

External links
[ Peter Blakeley] at Allmusic
Peter Blakeley from the original on 22 October 2013 at Australian Rock Database by Magnus Holmgren. Retrieved on 4 March 2014
Peter Blakeley at Billboard.com

Discographies of Australian artists